The peptidyl transferase is an aminoacyltransferase as well as the primary enzymatic function of the ribosome, which forms peptide bonds between adjacent amino acids using tRNAs during the translation process of protein biosynthesis. The substrates for the peptidyl transferase reaction are two tRNA molecules, one bearing the growing peptide chain and the other bearing the amino acid that will be added to the chain. The peptidyl chain and the amino acids are attached to their respective tRNAs via ester bonds to the O atom at the CCA-3' ends of these tRNAs. Peptidyl transferase is an enzyme that catalyzes the addition of an amino acid residue in order to grow the polypeptide chain in protein synthesis. It is located in the large ribosomal subunit, where it catalyzes the peptide bond formation.  It is composed entirely of RNA. The alignment between the CCA ends of the ribosome-bound peptidyl tRNA and aminoacyl tRNA in the peptidyl transferase center contribute to its ability to catalyze these reactions. This reaction occurs via nucleophilic displacement. The amino group of the aminoacyl tRNA attacks the terminal carboxyl group of the peptidyl tRNA. Peptidyl transferase activity is carried out by the ribosome. Peptidyl transferase activity is not mediated by any ribosomal proteins but by ribosomal RNA (rRNA), a ribozyme. Ribozymes are the only enzymes which are not made up of proteins, but ribonucleotides. All other enzymes are made up of proteins. This RNA relic is the most significant piece of evidence supporting the RNA World hypothesis.

  In Prokaryotes, the 50S (23S component) ribosome subunit contains the peptidyl transferase component and acts as a ribozyme. The peptidyl transferase center on the 50S subunit lies at the lower tips (acceptor ends) of the A- and P- site tRNAs.  
 In Eukaryotes, the 60S (28S component) ribosome subunit contains the peptidyl transferase component and acts as the ribozyme.

Peptidyl transferases are not limited to translation, but there are relatively few enzymes with this function.

Function 
Peptidyl transferase speeds up the reaction by lowering its energy of activation. It does this by providing proper orientation for the reaction to occur. The peptidyl transferase provides proximity, meaning that it brings thing closer together, but it does not provide an alternate mechanism. Instead, it provides proper substrate orientation, increasing the probability that the existing mechanism will occur.

Mechanism

Background 
In a ribosomal structure there are three binding sites which are P site, A site, and E site. The A site is the  aminoacyl site because what comes into the A site is the aminoacyl tRNA.  The structure contains an amino acid residue that is in an ester linkage attached to the A site and there is a free amine. In the P site, which is a peptidyl site, there is a tRNA that is attached. It's important to note that at the beginning of every cycle of Peptidyl Transferase you always start with a tRNA with a growing peptide chain in the P site. Once that occurs the aminoacyl tRNA can bind to the A site.

Actual Mechanism 

In regards to the mechanisms, the amine that is located in the A site is going to do a nucleophilic attack on the ester carbon in the P site. When the nucleophilic attack occurs, a tetrahedral intermediate will be created. In the active site of the peptidyl transferase, there is a water residue. When the tetrahedral intermediate is formed, the oxyanion now has a negative charge because the oxygen has one extra electron. The hydrogen on the water has a partial positive charge, which stabilizes the tetrahedral oxyanion intermediate. What will then occur is that the tetrahedral intermediate will collapse and lead to reformation of the carbonyl bond which results in the loss of the leaving group- that would be the P site ribose ring with the tRNA attached to it. With the release of the leaving group, the proton will be abstracted from the water which will lead to abstracting the proton from the two prime hydroxyl groups and the lone pairs will abstract the proton from the new amine of the amino acid. After the mechanism is complete, a non-acylated tRNA will remain in the P site and the entire growing polypeptide chain in addition to the extra amino acids are all attached in an ester linkage to the three prime hydroxyl groups of the tRNA in the A site.

Antibiotic target
The following protein synthesis inhibitors target peptidyl transferase:
Chloramphenicol binds to A2451 and A2452 residues in the 23S rRNA of the ribosome and inhibits peptide bond formation.
Pleuromutilins also bind to peptidyl transferase.
Macrolide antibiotics are thought to inhibit peptidyl transferase, in addition to inhibiting ribosomal translocation.

See also 
Enzyme
Transferase
Translation

References

External links 
 

EC 2.3.2